Ganwaar is a 1970 Indian film produced and directed by Naresh Kumar. It stars Rajendra Kumar, Vyjayanthimala, Pran, Jeevan in pivotal roles. The film's music is by Naushad. This is Vyjayanthimala's last film. The film proved that Naushad is not only good at classical but modern music as well.

Plot 
Raja Sahib is a pious and good-hearted man. After the death of his wife he sent his only son Gopal(Rajendra Kumar) to England for higher education and himself got married. His young wife handed over the management of the lands to her brother Vijay Bahadur(Pran (actor)) and leaving him helpless in these matter. Vijay Bahadur is a terror to helpless farmers. when Paro(Vyjayanthimala) comes to stay in that village, she decides to raise her voice against this terror and take a deputation to Raja Sahib in the city. Gopal returns with new ideas about farming wanting to make his father's jagir an example of prosperity, where the tenants and the landlords live in peace and harmony. When Paro comes to the city with the farmers, Gopal is shocked to hear the tale of their misery and plight. When he interferes his stepmother opposes him. He disappears from home and disguise himself as Garibdas to make his dream alive. He mixes up with the farmers and lives with them. Vijay Bahadur sets fire to the crops ready for harvest and not a single grain is left for the villagers. Gopal when knows the truth he wants to expose Vijay Bahadur, but before he can do so, Vijay Bahadur manages to get him murdered by Garibdas. Garibdas is produced in the court where it is revealed by that Garibdas and Gopal are in fact two faces of the same person.

Cast
 Rajendra Kumar as Gopal Rai / Garibdas
 Vyjayanthimala as Parvati "Paro"
 Pran as Vijay Bahadur
 Jeevan as Bajrangilal
 Tarun Bose as Raja Ram Pratap Rai
 Nishi as Mrs. Rai
 David as Khan 
 Viju Khote as Villager
 Ram Mohan as Hariya 
 Tabassum as Mistress
 Dulari  as Gopal's Mother

Soundtrack
Rajendra Krishan wrote all the songs.

External links 
 

1970 films
1970s Hindi-language films
Films scored by Naushad